Low Bush River is a community in the Cochrane District of Ontario.

The place is counted as part of Cochrane, Unorganized, North Part in Canadian census data.

Communities in Cochrane District